The Strongman is the name of three different fictional characters appearing in American comic books published by Marvel Comics.

Publication history
The Bruce Olafson version of Strongman first appeared in Incredible Hulk #3 (September 1962) as a member of the Circus of Crime, and was created by Stan Lee and Steve Ditko. The character subsequently appears in The Amazing Spider-Man #16 (September 1964), The Avengers #22 (November 1965), Thor #145 (October 1967), Ghost Rider #72-73 (September–October 1982), The Sensational She-Hulk #1 (May 1989), and X-Men and Power Pack #3 (February 2006). The Strongman appeared as part of the "Circus of Crime" entry in the Official Handbook of the Marvel Universe Deluxe Edition #2.

Fictional character biography

Bruce Olafsen

Bruce Olafsen was born in Stockholm, Sweden, but later came to the United States and became a naturalized American citizen. As a longtime member of the criminal organization Circus of Crime, Bruto the Strongman works as a circus strongman and weight-lifter. He has particularly strong biceps and teeth. Bruto the Strongman first assisted the Circus of Crime to rob the people that attended the circus and were hypnotized by Ringmaster with one of the attendees being Rick Jones. When Hulk came bursting through the tent, Strongman and the rest of the Circus of Crime attacked Hulk where Ringmaster manages to hypnotize Hulk in order to be part of his next circus act. The next day, Hulk manages to break free from Ringmaster's control and defeat the Circus of Crime before leaving with Rick upon the arrival of Thunderbolt Ross' army.

Strongman was later seen with Ringmaster when he has hypnotized Daredevil into serving him. Spider-Man manages to break Daredevil free of the hypnosis as they both defeat the Circus of Crime.

Strongman was seen at the Circus of Crime when Hawkeye, Quicksilver, and Scarlet Witch wanted to join the circus where they were unaware that it was a cover for the Circus of Crime. Strongman joins the Circus of Crime into fleeing when they claimed that the three superheroes were trying to rob their circus.

When Strongman is laid out upon straining himself upon trying to lift an elephant, Ringmaster had to hold auditions for a temporary strongman to cover for Strongman.

Strongman was present when Ringmaster when he forced Black Goliath into joining the Circus of Crime and fighting Power Man leading the two of them to be hypnotized. After the hypnosis on Power Man was undone, he fought the rest of the Circus of Crime and freed Black Goliath from their control while turning the hypnosis against them enough to leave them for the police.

Strongman was with the Ringmaster when the Circus of Crime attacked Hulk and the ex-Circus of Crime members on a deserted island. After freeing the ex-Circus of Crime members, Hulk defeats the Circus of Crime.

Strongman was with the Circus of Crime at the time when Ringmaster had hypnotized Dragon Man into serving him. The Circus of Crime is defeated by Hulk again where they managed to get away.

Strongman was with the Circus of Crime when they were seen in Bagalia.

During the "Opening Salvo" part of the Secret Empire storyline, Strongman was with the Circus of Crime at the time when they are recruited by Baron Helmut Zemo to join the Army of Evil.

Percy Van Norton
Percy Van Norton took a serum which made him into a "perfect human" with a range of superhuman abilities. But although he started out fighting crime, something went wrong and he turned bad, ending up fighting as a Nazi as a member of the Battle-Axis. Percy Van Norton joined the Battle-AXis in their fight against the Invaders. At the end of the battle, Van Norton and the other Battle-Axis members was defeated and captured.

NOTE: This character is based on the public domain character Strongman that first appeared in Crash Comics #2 (May 1940) as a wartime hero. As a Marvel character however, he is a retcon addition where he did not appear in a Timely book. The character had fallen into the public domain and was used by Marvel as a villainous member of the Battle-Axis for their second volume of The Invaders.

Spider-Squad's Strongman
The third Strongman appears as a member of the Spider-Squad where they were used by Anton DeLionatus in a plot to gain cash from his failed project. He alongside the Spider-Squad and Anton DeLionatus were defeated by Spider-Man.

Powers and abilities
The Bruce Olafsen version of Strongman has no superhuman powers, but is strong and a skilled wrestler.

The drug that Percy van Norton took gave him superhuman strength, dexterity, stamina, and durability.

In other media

Television
 The Bruce Olafsen version of Strongman appears in the 1981 animated series Spider-Man episode "Carnival of Crime".
 The Bruce Olafsen version of Strongman appears in the Avengers Assemble episode "Crime and Circuses", voiced by Adrian Pasdar. He is seen as a member of the Circus of Crime.

References

External links
 Strongman at Marvel.com
 Strongman at Marvel Wiki

Characters created by Stan Lee
Characters created by Steve Ditko
Comics characters introduced in 1962
Marvel Comics supervillains